Gianni Fabiano (born 9 July 1984) is an Italian footballer who plays as a midfielder for Serie D club A.C. Mestre.

Career
Born in Milan, Lombardy, Fabiano started his professional career at Meda. He then spent 1 season with Serie D team Canzese.

In 2004, he was signed by Serie C1 club Como.

In 2007, he was signed by Parma along with Alessandro Wilson, Alessio Tombesi and Manuel Pascali. He was loaned back to Carpenedolo. In summer 2008, he was signed by Bassano in co-ownership deal.

In 2010, he was signed by Carpi. From 2011 to 2015 he played in the Pro Vercelli; in the summer of 2015 he moved to Venezia.

References

External links
 Bassano Profile 
 Football.it Profile  
 

1984 births
Footballers from Milan
Living people
Italian footballers
Association football midfielders
Como 1907 players
A.C. Carpenedolo players
Parma Calcio 1913 players
Bassano Virtus 55 S.T. players
A.C. Carpi players
F.C. Pro Vercelli 1892 players
Venezia F.C. players
A.C. Mestre players
Serie B players
Serie C players
Serie D players
A.C. Meda 1913 players